The 2001 Harrah's 500 was the seventh stock car race of the 2001 NASCAR Winston Cup Series and the fifth iteration of the event. The race was held on Sunday, April 1, 2001, in Fort Worth, Texas at Texas Motor Speedway, a 1.5 miles (2.4 km) permanent tri-oval shaped racetrack. The race took the scheduled 334 laps to complete. A call for four tires for Robert Yates Racing driver Dale Jarrett would prove to be instrumental as he would slice his way through the field on the final restart with 18 to go to win the race. The win was Jarrett's 27th career NASCAR Winston Cup Series victory and his second of the season. To fill out the podium, Steve Park, driving for Dale Earnhardt, Inc., and Johnny Benson Jr., driving for MBV Motorsports, would finish second and third, respectively.

Background 

Texas Motor Speedway is a speedway located in the northernmost portion of the U.S. city of Fort Worth, Texas – the portion located in Denton County, Texas. The track measures 1.5 miles (2.4 km) around and is banked 24 degrees in the turns, and is of the oval design, where the front straightaway juts outward slightly. The track layout is similar to Atlanta Motor Speedway and Charlotte Motor Speedway (formerly Lowe's Motor Speedway). The track is owned by Speedway Motorsports, Inc., the same company that owns Atlanta and Charlotte Motor Speedway, as well as the short-track Bristol Motor Speedway.

Entry list 

 (R) denotes rookie driver.

Practice

First practice 
The first practice session was held on Friday, March 30, at 11:45 AM CST. The session would last for two hours.

Second and final practice 
The final practice session, sometimes referred to as Happy Hour, was held on Saturday, March 31, at 10:00 AM CST. The session would last for one hour and 30 minutes.

Qualifying 
Qualifying was held on Friday, March 30, at 3:00 PM CST. Each driver would have two laps to set a fastest time; the fastest of the two would count as their official qualifying lap. Positions 1-36 would be decided on time, while positions 37-43 would be based on provisionals. Six spots are awarded by the use of provisionals based on owner's points. The seventh is awarded to a past champion who has not otherwise qualified for the race. If no past champ needs the provisional, the next team in the owner points will be awarded a provisional.

Two drivers would fail to qualify: Kyle Petty and Rick Mast.

Full qualifying results

Race results

References 

2001 NASCAR Winston Cup Series
NASCAR races at Texas Motor Speedway
April 2001 sports events in the United States
2001 in sports in Texas